Jorma Ilmari Aalto (born 24 August 1957) is a Finnish cross-country skier. He competed in the men's 30 kilometre cross-country ski race at the 1980 Winter Olympics.

Cross-country skiing results
All results are sourced from the International Ski Federation (FIS).

Olympic Games

World Cup

Season standings

References

1957 births
Living people
Cross-country skiers at the 1980 Winter Olympics
Finnish male skiers
Olympic cross-country skiers of Finland
Sportspeople from Tampere
20th-century Finnish people
21st-century Finnish people